Matca is a commune in Galați County, Western Moldavia, Romania. It is composed of a single village, Matca.

References

Communes in Galați County
Localities in Western Moldavia